American country music artist Dustin Lynch has released five studio albums, one extended play, fourteen music videos, and seventeen singles, of which eight have reached number one on Country Airplay. He first charted a number one single with "Where It's At".

Studio albums

Extended plays

Singles

Other charted songs

Music videos

Notes

References

Country music discographies
Discographies of American artists